Scott Yuill Thomson (born 8 November 1966 in Edinburgh) is a Scottish former professional football goalkeeper, who played mainly for Raith Rovers and won the 1994 Scottish League Cup Final when the Stark's Park club defeated Celtic at Ibrox Park. Since retiring as a player, he has worked as a goalkeeping coach.

Playing career
Thomson started his professional career at Dundee United. He made his first team debut on 2 May 1987 in a 2–1 victory at Tannadice against Hibernian, but went on to play just five other first team games for the club before being loaned out to Barnsley. He signed for Forfar Athletic in 1991 before joining Raith Rovers in 1993.

During his time at Stark's Park, Thomson played in over 100 first team games, winning the Scottish Football League First Division and Scottish League Cup. Thomson famously saved the decisive penalty kick from Paul McStay in the 1994 Scottish League Cup Final. Thomson had been sent off in the semi-final against Airdrieonians; substitute Brian Potter saved a penalty that allowed Raith to progress to the final. Thomson played a key role as Raith set up a lucrative UEFA Cup tie against Bayern Munich.

Thomson went on to have spells at Hull City, then a loan spell from the English club at Motherwell, before joining Airdrieonians in 1998. Thomson finished his career playing at Dunfermline Athletic, where he played alongside Scott M. Thomson (as had briefly been the case at Raith), although part of his final season was at Brechin City on loan.

Coaching
Thomson was given his first coaching job at Dunfermline Athletic while still technically registered as a player. At East End Park Thomson forged a special bond with striker Craig Brewster and goalkeeper Derek Stillie and later joined them both at Tannadice when the striker was appointed player-manager of Dundee United. Thomson remained as goalkeeping coach under Craig Levein after the departure of Brewster and Stillie. Thomson was released from his contract in May 2009 after Levein stated his intention to appoint an experienced player who could also coach, rather than a specialist coach like Thomson. Thomson was then hired by Hibernian to serve as their goalkeeping coach, replacing Gordon Marshall. Thomson departed Hibernian in the summer of 2014 and subsequently joined Ross County.

Personal life
He is the father of current Raith Rovers goalkeeper Robbie Thomson.

Honours
Raith Rovers
 Scottish League Cup: 1994–95
 Scottish League First Division: 1994–95

Individual
 Raith Rovers Hall of Fame

References

External links
 

1966 births
Living people
Footballers from Edinburgh
Association football goalkeepers
Scottish footballers
Scottish Premier League players
Scottish Football League players
English Football League players
Dundee United F.C. players
Raith Rovers F.C. players
Forfar Athletic F.C. players
Hull City A.F.C. players
Motherwell F.C. players
Airdrieonians F.C. (1878) players
Dunfermline Athletic F.C. players
Brechin City F.C. players
Dundee United F.C. non-playing staff
Hibernian F.C. non-playing staff
Lothian Thistle Hutchison Vale F.C. players
Association football goalkeeping coaches